This is a list of newspapers in South Dakota.This is a list of daily newspapers currently published in South Dakota. For weekly newspapers, see List of newspapers in South Dakota.

Current news publications
 Aberdeen American News - Aberdeen, Daily
 Alcester Union & Hudsonite - Alcester/Hudson, Weekly
 Argus Leader - Sioux Falls, Daily
 Arlington Sun - Arlington, South Dakota
 Bennett County Booster II - Martin
 Beresford Republic - Beresford
 Bison Courier - Bison
 Black Hills Pioneer - Spearfish
 Brandon Valley Challenger - Brandon
 Britton Journal - Britton
 Brookings Register - Brookings
 Capital Journal - Pierre
 Central Dakota Times - Chamberlain
 Clark County Courier - Clark
 Clear Lake Courier - Clear Lake
 Custer County Chronicle - Custer
 Day County Reporter and Farmer - Webster
 Faulk County Record - Faulkton
 Freeman Courier - Freeman
 Grant County Review - Milbank
 Gregory Times-Advocate - Gregory
 Hot Springs Star - Hot Springs
 Huron Plainsman - Huron
 Indian Country Today - Rapid City
 Kadoka Press - Kadoka (1908-1942, defunct)
 Lakota Daily Times - Martin
 Lennox Independent - Lennox
 Madison Daily Leader - Madison
 Meade County Times-Tribune - Sturgis
 Miller Press - Miller
 Miner County Pioneer - Howard
 Mitchell Daily Republic - Mitchell
 Mobridge Tribune - Mobridge
 Moody County Enterprise - Flandreau
 Onida Watchman - Onida
 Parkston Advance - Parkston
 Pioneer Review - Philip 
 Plain Talk - Vermillion
 Platte Entreprise - Platte
 Potter County News - Gettysburg
 Prairie Pioneer - Pollock 
 Rapid City Journal - Rapid City
 Redfield Press - Redfield
 Sioux Valley News - Canton
 Sisseton Courier - Sisseton
 Sota Iya Ye Yapi - Wilmot
 South Dakota Messenger - Pierre (1912-1914, defunct)
 Southern Union County Leader-Courier - Elk Point
 Timber Lake Topic - Timber Lake
 Todd County Tribune - Mission
 True Dakotan - Wessington Springs
 Vermillion Plain Talk - Vermillion
 Wagner Post - Wagner
 Watertown Public Opinion - Watertown
 West River Eagle - Eagle Butte
 Winner Advocate - Winner
 Woonsocket Sanborn Weekly Journal - Woonsocket
 Yankton Daily Press & Dakotan - Yankton
See also

References